Łukasz Drzewiński (born 9 March 1984) is a Polish former swimmer, who specialized in freestyle and butterfly events. Drzewinski won a silver medal in the 200 m butterfly at the 2002 European Junior Swimming Championships in Linz, Austria with a time of 2:00.21, edging out Ukraine's Serhiy Advena by 0.04 of a second. He is a member of the swimming team for AZS Warszawa, and is coached and trained by Roberta Białeckiego.

Drzewinski qualified for the men's 400 m freestyle at the 2004 Summer Olympics in Athens, by finishing second from the Olympic test event, in an A-standard time of 3:51.44. Drzewinski failed to qualify for the final, as he placed fourteenth out of 47 swimmers in the morning's preliminary heats, lowering his entry time to 3:50.97. In the 200 m freestyle, Drzewinski challenged seven other swimmers on the fifth heat, including three-time Olympian Jacob Carstensen of Denmark. He came only in sixth by 0.12 of a second behind Portugal's Luís Monteiro with a time of 1:51.90. Drzewinski failed to advance into the semifinals, as he placed thirtieth overall in the preliminaries.

References

External links
 
 
 

1984 births
Living people
Polish male butterfly swimmers
Olympic swimmers of Poland
Swimmers at the 2004 Summer Olympics
Polish male freestyle swimmers
Sportspeople from Gorzów Wielkopolski
Universiade medalists in swimming
Universiade bronze medalists for Poland
21st-century Polish people